The 2009–10 Moldovan "B" Division was the 19th season of Liga 2, the third tier of the Moldovan football league system. 27 teams participated in two geographic divisions; 13 teams played in Division North and 14 played in Division South. Dinamo-Auto Tiraspol won the title and promotion to Liga 1 in the club's first season.

"B" Division North

Final standings

"B" Division South

Final standings

References

External links 
"B" Division - moldova.sports.md

Moldovan Liga 2 seasons
3
Moldova